Shanghai No. 2 High School is a key public high school located in Shanghai, China. With a history of 115 years, Shanghai No.2 High School currently has two major campuses with over 1440 students and 140 faculties. The school library has a collection of over one hundred thousand volumes.

Founded in 1902 by Wu Xin as Wu Pen Girls' School, Shanghai No.2 High School was the first independent girls' school established by Chinese in the 20th century. In 1947, the academy was moved to 200 Yongkang Road (formerly 209 Route Remi), the original campus of Ecole Primaire Russe (俄國初級小學), later renamed Ecole Municipale Française-Ecole Rémy (法國雷米小學). In 1952, Wu Pen Girls' School was renamed Shanghai No. 2 Girls' High School. In September 1967, it was renamed Shanghai No. 2 High School, when it became a co-educational public school.

Campuses 
Shanghai No. 2 High School has two major campuses.

Xuhui Campus is located on 200 Yongkang Road, which was the original campus of Ecole Primaire Russe(俄國初級小學), later renamed Ecole Municipale Française-Ecole Rémy (法國雷米小學).

Meilong Campus is located on 1 Wuben Road, which was named after the school's former name. The new Meilong Campus was completed in 2015 with more advanced and comprehensive facilities than the old Xuhui Campus.

Shanghai No.2 High School's sister schools are Needham High School in Needham, Massachusetts, US and Wittelsbacher-Realschule Aichach in Germany.

History 
Shanghai No.2 High School, formerly Wu Pen Girls' School, was established by Wu Xin in 1902. Wu Xin was born in Shanghai County. He went to Nanyang Public School (Now Shanghai Jiao Tong University) in 1897 and graduated three years later. In the traditional Chinese society, the prejudice that "Mediocrity is the virtue of women." was ingrained, and women had no right to enjoy education. Witnessing women's poor condition under the feudal society, Wu Xin determined to found an academy dedicated to female education.

On 24 October 1902, Wu Xin named his family school Wu Pen Girls' School and began enrolling students publicly since then. Miss Shen Zhushu was hired as school counsellor. Wu Pen Girls' School was the first girls' school founded by Chinese. There were only 7 students and 2 grades in the beginning. Due to the high quality of education, the enrollment started to increase sharply. In 1913, Wu Xin donated the school to Shanghai County government. In August 1937, the campus was destroyed by the Japanese Army in World War II. Wu Pen Girls' School was renamed Huaijiu Junior High School for Girls (怀久女子中学, formerly 77 Route Pichon) after the attack, and the school set up a board.

In 1942, Japanese Army occupied Shanghai concessions. The school was forced to close. After the war ended in 1945, Wu Pen Girls' School reopened. In 1949, Shanghai was occupied by China Communist Party during the Chinese Civil War. Wu Pen Girls' School was then renamed Shanghai No.2 Girls' High School in 1952. In September 1967, the school was renamed Shanghai No.2 High School, when it became a co-educational public school.

Alumni 

 Yao Ming—NBA basketball player
 Hu Ge—director, singer, actor
 Li Minhua, physicist, academician of the Chinese Academy of Sciences
 Neil Shen—founder of Ctrip and Home Inn
 Yan Junqi—vice chairwoman of the standing committee of the National People's Congress of China
 Xu Zheng—actor, director
 Qiu Xinyi—singer, actor
 Zuo Yi—singer
 Zhang Jinqiu—scientist, architect, asteroid #210232 was officially named after Ms. Zhang Jinqiu
 Yang Yinyu—the first female university president in modern China

References 

High schools in Shanghai
Educational institutions established in 1902
1902 establishments in China